William G. Scott Jr. (born c. 1980) is a Canadian ice hockey executive. He is the assistant general manager for the Edmonton Oilers of the National Hockey League (NHL).

Prior to joining the Oilers on April 21, 2014, Scott was the general manager for Oklahoma City Barons. When the Barons franchise relocated in 2015 and became the Bakersfield Condors, he stayed on as the team's general manager.

References

External links
Bill Scott's profile at EliteProspects.com

Year of birth uncertain
Living people
Canadian sports executives and administrators
Edmonton Oilers executives
Oklahoma City Barons
People from Markham, Ontario
Year of birth missing (living people)